Lake Creek is a stream in Benton, Morgan and
Pettis counties in the U.S. state of Missouri. It is a tributary of Flat Creek.

Lake Creek was so named on account of the observation the creek resembles a lake during high water.

See also
List of rivers of Missouri

References

Rivers of Benton County, Missouri
Rivers of Morgan County, Missouri
Rivers of Pettis County, Missouri
Rivers of Missouri